Frondihabitans sucicola is a Gram-positive, aerobic, mesophilic, rod-shaped and motile bacterium from the genus Frondihabitans which has been isolated from the sap of the tree Acer mono in Korea.

References

External links
Type strain of Frondihabitans sucicola at BacDive -  the Bacterial Diversity Metadatabase

Microbacteriaceae
Bacteria described in 2014